Alpine skiing at the 2011 Asian Winter Games was held at Shymbulak Alpine Sport Resort in Almaty, Kazakhstan. The six events were scheduled for January 31– February 4, 2011.

Schedule

Medalists

Men

Women

Medal table

Participating nations
A total of 39 athletes from 13 nations competed in alpine skiing at the 2011 Asian Winter Games:

References

Men's Super-G
Men's Downhill
Men's Super Combined
Women's Super-G
Women's Downhill
Women's Super Combined

External links
 Official website

 
Asian Winter Games
2011 Asian Winter Games events
2011